McKenzie Kurtz (born January 13, 1997) is an American actress, singer, and dancer. In her Broadway debut, she played the role of Anna in Frozen.

Early life 
Kurtz's childhood home is in Alpharetta, Georgia. Kurtz was active in her high school's theater program, playing the titular role of Mary Poppins at Milton High School in 2015. In 2015, Kurtz was also a finalist for a Jimmy Award.
Kurtz is a 2019 graduate of the University of Michigan School of Music, Theatre, and Dance.

Career 

Kurtz played Ariel in a production of Footloose at The Muny directed by Christian Borle in 2019.

In Kurtz's 2020 Broadway debut, she played the role of Anna in the musical Frozen opposite Ciara Renée as Elsa and Ryan McCartan as Hans. According to Kurtz, her initial audition for the role did not go well, but she was personally offered a second chance by Kristen Anderson-Lopez after the co-songwriter of Frozen saw her sing at a "Women of Broadway" concert.

In 2021, Kurtz appeared in the ensemble of Annie Live! on NBC.

From March 17 to April 11, 2022, Kurtz reprised her role of Anna in the Frozen US national tour. During the tour she was reunited with McCartan, her Broadway Hans.

Kurtz originated the role of Penelope in the 2022 world premiere musical of Trading Places at the Alliance Theatre in Atlanta. The production was directed by Kenny Leon.

On January 13, 2023, it was announced that Kurtz would assume the role of Glinda in the Broadway company of Wicked at the Gershwin Theatre on February 14, taking over for Brittney Johnson.

Stage credits

References

External links
 McKenzie Kurtz on Twitter

1997 births
Living people
University of Michigan School of Music, Theatre & Dance alumni